Tharanallur is a neighbourhood of the city of Tiruchirappalli in Tamil Nadu, India. It is situated in the heart of the city.

References 

 

Neighbourhoods and suburbs of Tiruchirappalli